Justus van Huysum II, sometimes styled Justus II van Huysum or Justus van Huysum the Younger (1684–1706) was a member of the van Huysum Dutch painting family. He painted “battle-pieces with extraordinary spirit and facility.” He died relatively young but his artworks are in the Herzog Anton Ulrich Museum in Braunschweig, Germany and the Rijksmuseum in Amsterdam.

References 

1684 births
1706 deaths
Dutch painters
Huysum family of painters